The 2013 SaskTel Tankard will be held from January 30 to February 3 at the Northern Lights Palace in Melfort, Saskatchewan. The winning team will represent Saskatchewan at the 2013 Tim Hortons Brier in Edmonton, Alberta.

Qualification

Teams
The teams are listed as follows:

Knockout Draw Brackets

A Event

B Event

C Event

Playoffs

A vs. B
Saturday, February 2, 7:00 pm

C1 vs. C2
Saturday, February 2, 7:00 pm

Semifinal
Sunday, February 3, 9:30 am

Final
Sunday, February 3, 2:00 pm

References

SaskTel Tankard Information 
Official site

SaskTel Tankard
Curling in Saskatchewan